Ekaterina Aleksandrovna Subbotina (born 11 February 1995) is a Russian sport shooter. She represents Russia at the 2020 Summer Olympics in Tokyo.

References

1995 births
Living people
Russian female sport shooters
Shooters at the 2020 Summer Olympics
Olympic shooters of Russia
Sportspeople from Izhevsk
21st-century Russian women